Phu Pha Man is the northwesternmost district (amphoe) of Khon Kaen province, northeastern Thailand.

History
The district was established as a minor district (king amphoe) on 15 July 1981 with the two tambons Non Don and Na Fai split off from Chum Phae district. The administration started operation on 1 September 1981, and on 1 October 1981 the district office building was opened. On 4 July 1994 the minor district was upgraded to a full district.

Geography
Neighboring districts are (from the north clockwise): Phu Kradueng of Loei province; Chum Phae of Khon Kaen Province; Khon San of Chaiyaphum province; and Nam Nao of Phetchabun province.

Administration
The district is divided into five subdistricts (tambons), which are further subdivided into 41 villages (mubans). Phu Pha Man is a township (thesaban tambon) which covers parts of tambons Phu Pha Man and Non Dong. There are a further five tambon administrative organizations (TAO).

References

External links
amphoe.com

Phu Pha Man